Lilian Bochet (born 4 March 1991) is a French footballer who currently plays for KSCT Menen as a central midfielder.

Career 
Bochet began his career on Valenciennes FC. On 28 August 2010, he made his Ligue 1 debut, against Montpellier HSC.

After one season with first team, Bochet was released.

In January 2019, he returned to RFC Seraing.

References

External links

1991 births
Living people
People from Maubeuge
French footballers
French expatriate footballers
Association football midfielders
Valenciennes FC players
US Roye-Noyon players
R.F.C. Seraing (1922) players
F91 Dudelange players
K.S.V. Roeselare players
R. Olympic Charleroi Châtelet Farciennes players
Expatriate footballers in Belgium
Expatriate footballers in Luxembourg
Challenger Pro League players
Sportspeople from Nord (French department)
Footballers from Hauts-de-France
French expatriate sportspeople in Belgium
French expatriate sportspeople in Luxembourg